Devitt and Moore was a British shipping company formed by Thomas Henry Devitt and Joseph Moore in 1836.  They became shipowners and entered the passenger and cargo trade to Australia managing and owning many clipper ships such as the City of Adelaide and the South Australian.  With the advent of steam, they developed a training scheme for cadets and formed Pangbourne College.

Devitt and Moore fleet
In purchasing their first two full-rigged ships from Duncan Dunbar in 1863, Devitt and Moore started their long connection with Australia as shipowners.  Over the next fifty-five years until the end of the First World War when they finally conceded to the competition from steamships, at various times the Devitt and Moore fleet comprised twenty-nine square-rigged sailing ships and two steamships carrying passengers, wool, copper and general cargo between Great Britain and Australia. Thomas Henry Devitt's grandson Howson Foulger Devitt went on to establish the insurance broker Devitt Insurance in 1936.

The following list of ships owned by Devitt and Moore was adapted from a book by Captain A G Course.

Gallery

References

External links
Pangbourne College Website
City of Adelaide Clipper Ship - Devitt and Moore

Maritime history of Australia
1836 establishments in England
Defunct shipping companies of the United Kingdom